Yassine Haouari (born 13 February 2003) is an Algerian professional footballer who plays as a forward for the B-team of Ligue 2 club Valenciennes and the Algeria national under-20 football team.

Career 
On 15 May 2021, Haouari made his professional debut for Valenciennes in a 4–3 Ligue 2 loss to Pau FC. He scored the final goal of the match, a lob from 40 meters away from the goal.

Personal life 
Born in France, Haouari is of Algerian descent.

References

External links 
 
 

2003 births
Living people
French sportspeople of Algerian descent
French footballers
Association football forwards
Valenciennes FC players
Ligue 2 players